Álvar García de Santa María (1370 – March 21, 1460) was a Spanish historian and Jewish convert to Roman Catholicism during the late Middle Ages. He was born in 1370 into a prominent Castilian Jewish family, but converted in 1390 at the time of evangelization  of the Jewish community by St. Vincent Ferrer. His brother Pablo de Santa María also converted and later became Bishop of Burgos, as did Álvar's nephew Alphonso de Cartagena, another Jewish convert.

Álvar later became a senior court historian and chronicler of the reign of King John II of Castile, probably compiling the Crónica de Juan II (or Chronicle of John II). He has also been put forward as the potential author of the book Crónica de don Álvaro de Luna written in the 1450s, the authorship of which is in dispute. Álvar died on March 21, 1460 at a great age.

References 
 This article is based on a translation of an article from the Spanish Wikipedia
 Brief Biography from Biography.com

1370 births
1460 deaths
15th-century Spanish historians
Jewish historians
14th-century Castilian Jews
Converts to Roman Catholicism from Judaism
Spanish Roman Catholics
Conversos
15th-century Castilians
Date of birth unknown